Power Spot is an album by American trumpet player and composer Jon Hassell recorded in 1983 and 1984 and released on the ECM label.

The cover art reproduces the Whirling Snakes or Whirling Mountain sandpainting of the Navajo Shooting Chant, one of the most important and most complex of the Navajo healing ceremonies.

Reception
The Allmusic review by Mark Kirschenmann awarded the album 4 stars stating "While not as stunning as Possible Musics, Power Spot is nonetheless one of the most significant recordings from this utterly unique musician".

Track listing
All compositions by Jon Hassell
 "Power Spot" - 7:07 
 "Passage D.E." - 5:25 
 "Solaire" - 6:49 
 "Miracle Steps" - 4:21 
 "Wing Melodies" - 7:33 
 "The Elephant and the Orchid" - 11:08 
 "Air" - 5:20 
Recorded at Grant Avenue Studio in Hamilton, Canada in October 1983 and December 1984

Personnel
Jon Hassell - trumpet
J. A. Deane - acoustic and electronic percussion, alto flute
Jean-Philippe Rykiel - electronic keyboards, facsimile bass, percussion, strings, etc.
Michael Brook - guitar, electronic treatments (tracks 1, 2 & 6)
Richard Horowitz - electronic keyboards (tracks 1 & 2)
Brian Eno - electric bass (tracks 3 & 5)
Richard Armin, Paul Armin - RAAD electro-acoustic strings (tracks 2 & 4)
Miguel Frasconi - flute (track 7)

References

ECM Records albums
Jon Hassell albums
Albums produced by Brian Eno
Albums produced by Daniel Lanois
1985 albums